Teperishevo (Täpäreş) is a rural locality (a selo) in Chuvalkipovsky Selsoviet, Chishminsky District, Bashkortostan, Russia. The population was 437 as of 2010. There are 8 streets.

Geography 
Teperishevo is located 43 km south of Chishmy (the district's administrative centre) by road. Chuvalkipovo is the nearest rural locality.

References 

Rural localities in Chishminsky District